The 1998–99 Toto Cup Leumit was the 15th season of the third most important football tournament in Israel since its introduction. 

It was held in two stages. First, sixteen Liga Leumit teams were divided into four groups. The group winners advanced to the semi-finals, which, as were the final held as one-legged matches.

The competition began on 15 August 1998 and ended on 2 February 1999, with Maccabi Tel Aviv beating Beitar Jerusalem 2–1 in the final.

Group stage
The matches were played from 15 August 1998 to 23 January 1999.

Group A

Group B

Group C

Group D

Elimination rounds

Semifinals

Final

See also
 1998–99 Toto Cup Artzit

External links
 Israel Cups 1998/99 RSSSF

Leumit
Toto Cup Leumit
Toto Cup Leumit